Wyckoff is a former commuter railroad train station in the township of Wyckoff, Bergen County, New Jersey. The station served trains of the New York, Susquehanna and Western Railway between Pavonia Terminal in Jersey City (until 1958) or Susquehanna Transfer in North Bergen (until 1966) to the station in Butler. The next station east was Wortendyke in Midland Park while the next one west was Campgaw station in Franklin Lakes. Wyckoff station consisted of one track and one low-level side platform for passenger service.

Railroad service in Wyckoff began on April 8, 1871 when the New Jersey Midland Railway commenced train operations to Pompton Township. Railroad service continued until June 30, 1966.

Station layout

See also
NYSW (passenger 1939-1966) map
Operating Passenger Railroad Stations Thematic Resource (New Jersey)

Notes

Bibliography

References 

Wyckoff, New Jersey
Railway stations in the United States opened in 1871
Railway stations closed in 1966
Former New York, Susquehanna and Western Railway stations
Former railway stations in New Jersey
Railway stations in Bergen County, New Jersey
1871 establishments in New Jersey
1966 disestablishments in New Jersey